Shao (Cantonese Romanisation: Shiu; Gwoyeu Romatzyh: Shaw) is a common Chinese family name. It is the 86th most populous family name in China. It corresponds to last name So in Korean; "Thiệu" or "Thiều" in Vietnamese; “Zau” in Wu Chinese/Shanghainese and Siu, Chow, or Sho in other Chinese romanisations. The origin of the family name Shao is thought to have come from the royal lines of the Zhou Dynasty in ancient China. The King's loyal subject Duke of Shao (召公), was thought to have originated the Shao lines.

Notable people
Shao Yong (邵雍; 1011–1077), philosopher, cosmologist, poet and historian who greatly influenced the development of Neo-Confucianism in China during the Song dynasty
Shao Mi (邵弥); ca. 1592-1642 Chinese landscape painter, calligrapher, and poet during the Ming Dynasty
Shao Jiayi 邵佳一 Chinese soccer player
Shao Ning (born 1982), Chinese judoka
Shao Xunmei a.k.a Zau Sinmay Chinese poet and publisher.
Shao Tong (1994–2014), Chinese student murdered in Iowa
The Shaw brothers:
 Runje Shaw (1896–1975)
 Runde Shaw (1899–1973)
 Runme Shaw (1901–1985)
 Run Run Shaw (1907–2014)
 Shao Yunhuan (邵云环), Chinese journalist killed in the 1999 United States bombing of the Chinese embassy in Belgrade
 Ivy Shao (邵雨薇; pinyin: Shao Yu Wei) is a Taiwanese actress

Fictional Characters
Shao Kahn Emperor of Outworld in the Mortal Kombat universe.

Chinese-language surnames
Individual Chinese surnames